¡Hey, Hey Pioneers! is the first studio album by the American alternative rock band Farewell Continental, released on May 10, 2011, by Paper + Plastick.

Track listing

Personnel
Justin Pierre – vocals, guitar
Kari Gray – vocals, keyboards
Thomas Rehbein – guitar
Jim Adolphson – bass guitar
Josh McKay – drums

References

2011 albums
Farewell Continental albums
Paper + Plastick albums